Rika may refer to:
 Rika, Ilam, Iran
 Rika, Jajce, a village in Bosnia and Herzegovina
 Rika, alternate name of Hasan Bagi-ye Rika, Iran
 Rika (river), in western Ukraine
 Riq'a, a calligraphic variety of Arabic script

People 
Rika is a Japanese feminine given name.
 Josefa Rika, a Fijian cricketer
, Japanese television personality and actress
 Rika Dialina, a Greek actress
, Japanese tennis player
, Japanese voice actress
, a former professional Japanese female tennis player
, Japanese figure skater
, Japanese gravure idol and actress
, Japanese J-pop idol, singer, and actress
, Japanese model, actress and singer
, a Japanese figure skater
, Japanese singer and idol
, Japanese women's footballer
, Japanese voice actress
, Japanese swimmer
, Japanese table tennis player
 Rika Vagiani, Greek artist
, Japanese idol and model

Characters 
 Rika (Phantasy Star IV), a character in the video game Phantasy Star IV
 Rika Furude, a  character from Higurashi no Naku Koro ni
 Rika Nonaka (Ruki Makino in the Japanese version), a character from Digimon Tamers
 Rika Sasaki, a character from Cardcaptor Sakura
 Rika, a character from the Touhou Project series
 Rika Shiguma, a character from the Haganai (Boku wa Tomodachi ga Sukunai) manga/anime series
 Rika Shinozaki (Lisbeth), a character in Sword Art Online
 Rika, a character from the role playing game Mystic Messenger
 Rika, a character from the visual Novel Amnesia

See also
 Rica (disambiguation)

Japanese feminine given names